Since the foundation of the Pacific Coast League (PCL) in 1903, its pitchers have thrown 169 no-hitters, which include 10 perfect games. Of these no-hitters, 108 were pitched in games that lasted at least the full 9 innings, while 61 were pitched in games shortened due to weather or that were played in doubleheaders, which are typically 7 innings. Only 3 of the league's 10 perfect games were tossed in full 9-inning games. Eleven no-hitters, including one perfect game, were combined—thrown by two or more pitchers on the same team.

A no-hit game occurs when a pitcher (or pitchers) allows no hits during the entire course of a game. A batter may still reach base via a walk, an error, a fielder's choice, a hit by pitch, a passed ball or wild pitch on strike three, or catcher's interference. Due to these methods of reaching base, it is possible for a team to score runs without getting any hits. While the vast majority of no-hitters are shutouts, teams which went hitless have managed to score runs in their respective games 24 times in PCL games, some in extra innings.

The first Pacific Coast League no-hitter was thrown on November 8, 1903, by Doc Newton of the Los Angeles Angels against the Oakland Recruits at Chutes Park in Los Angeles, California. The first perfect game was pitched on May 31, 1943, by Cotton Pippen of the Oakland Oaks against the Sacramento Solons at Moreing Field in Sacramento, California, as part of a seven-inning doubleheader. The first nine-inning perfect game occurred on July 7, 2001, when John Halama of the Tacoma Rainiers accomplished the feat against the Calgary Cannons at Cheney Stadium in Tacoma, Washington.

Nine league pitchers have thrown multiple no-hitters. The pitcher who holds the record for the shortest time between no-hit games is Tom Drees, who pitched two for the Vancouver Canadians five days apart in 1989. Drees threw a third no-hitter that season, giving him the record for the most career PCL no-hitters. After Drees, Charley Hall (1905 and 1906), Eli Cates (1906 and 1907), Charles Fanning (1914 and 1916), Elmer Singleton (1952 and 1955), Roger Bowman (1952 and 1954), Sam McDowell (1961 and 1964), Dick Estelle (1964 and 1965), and Alan Foster (both in 1967) have each thrown two no-hitters.

The team with the most no-hitters is the Portland Beavers, with 21, one of which was a perfect game. They are followed by the Oakland Commuters/Oaks (17 no-hitters, 1 a perfect game) and the Tacoma Rainiers (previously known as the Tigers, Giants, Twins, and Yankees; 17 no-hitters). The team with the most perfect games is the Nashville Sounds, with two. Of the three nine-inning perfect games in the league's history, two were thrown by Nashville.

No-hitters

No-hitters by team

Active Pacific Coast League teams appear in bold.

See also
List of American Association no-hitters
List of International League no-hitters

Notes

References
Specific

General

No-hitters
Pacific Coast League no-hitters